Basse-Côte-Nord Territory (French: Territoire de la Basse-Côte-Nord, meaning "lower north shore") was a territory equivalent to a regional county municipality (TE) in eastern Quebec, Canada. The territory, whose geographical code was 982, was formed in 2002 when it separated from the Minganie Regional County Municipality and was superseded by Le Golfe-du-Saint-Laurent Regional County Municipality that was formed in July 2010.

Together with Minganie RCM, Basse-Côte-Nord formed the census division of Minganie–Basse-Côte-Nord (now renamed Minganie–Le Golfe-du-Saint-Laurent), whose geographical code is 98.

It included all the communities along the Gulf of Saint Lawrence between the Natashquan River and the Newfoundland and Labrador border, but it had no regional administration.

Basse-Côte-Nord consisted of the following subdivisions, with their codes in parentheses:

 Municipality of Blanc-Sablon (98005)
 Municipality of Bonne-Espérance (98010)
 Municipality of Côte-Nord-du-Golfe-du-Saint-Laurent (98015)
 Municipality of Gros-Mécatina (98014) 
 Municipality of Saint-Augustin (98012)
 Indian reserve of La Romaine (98804) 
 Indian settlement of Pakuashipi (98802), located within the legal territory of Saint-Augustin.

References

Minganie--Basse-Côte-Nord Census Division, Quebec Statistics Canada

External links 
 Tourism Lower North Shore (English)
 Tourisme Basse-Côte-Nord (Français)
 Blanc-Sablon Tourism
 Basse-Côte-Nord Local website
 The Lower North Shore Community Web Site
 database of municipalities on the website of the Institut de la Statistique du Québec.

Former territories equivalent to a regional county municipality
Côte-Nord
States and territories established in 2002
States and territories disestablished in 2010
2002 establishments in Quebec
2010 disestablishments in Quebec
Populated places disestablished in 2010

de:Basse-Côte-Nord
fr:Basse-Côte-Nord
pl:Basse-Côte-Nord